Lauren Lee Smith (born June 19, 1980) is a Canadian actress. She is known for her television roles, including Emma DeLauro in the syndicated science fiction drama Mutant X, Riley Adams in the CBS forensics drama CSI: Crime Scene Investigation, police Sergeant Michelle McCluskey in the CTV fantasy drama The Listener and Frankie Drake in the CBC detective series Frankie Drake Mysteries.

Early life
Smith was born in Vancouver, British Columbia, Canada. When she was 14, her family moved to Los Angeles, California. There, she began a modelling career. She was born seven months before her cousin, the actor Myles Ferguson, who died in a car crash when Smith was 20.

Career
At the age of 19, Smith was cast in the remake of Get Carter. Later that year, Smith was cast in the starring role of Christy Huddleston in the television film Christy: The Movie, and its follow-up two-part miniseries Christy, Choices of the Heart. She starred in the show Mutant X, where she played the character of Emma deLauro from 2001 to 2003.

Throughout the 2000s, she guest-starred in episodes of The Dead Zone, The Twilight Zone, and Blade: The Series, among others. Smith was also a recurring character in the Showtime drama series The L Word, playing sous chef Lara Perkins. In 2005, Smith filmed the sexually explicit movie Lie with Me, where she played the character of Leila. The same year, she was cast in the 2006 romance film The Last Kiss.

In 2006, she had a recurring part on the Canadian drama Intelligence. In early 2007, she played Kath in the CBC miniseries Dragon Boys. The same year, Smith was cast in starring roles in the 2008 thriller film Pathology, and in the 2009 drama film Helen with Ashley Judd.

In 2008, Smith became a series regular in the ninth season on the long-running CBS forensics drama CSI: Crime Scene Investigation playing Riley Adams (originally named Bryce Adams), "a smart, flirtatious, and witty non-conformist who entered law enforcement to rebel against her judgmental psychiatrist father", who joins Grissom's team, to fill the void left by the departure of Jorja Fox's Sara Sidle. She and her character did not return for the tenth season.

In 2009 Smith was cast in one of the lead roles in the German television film  by RTL, which aired in February 2011 in Germany and was broadcast by American premium channel Encore in March 2013. In 2010, Smith returned to Canada and joined the cast of the CTV drama series The Listener for its second season. 

In 2012, she was cast in the starring role of Grace in the 2013 Canadian comedy film Cinemanovels alongside Jennifer Beals, with whom Smith had previously appeared in The L Word and the 2010 film A Night for Dying Tigers.

In 2014, Smith played government investigator Samantha Krueger on the CBC/Syfy science-fiction miniseries Ascension. In 2015, Smith joined the cast of the CBC drama series This Life, playing Maggie, the sister of the lead character (Torri Higginson) who is suffering from stage four cancer; Smith's portrayal of the character was well received by The Globe and Mail'''s John Doyle.

In 2017, she was cast in the lead role in the CBC drama series Frankie Drake Mysteries. The series ran for four seasons, and received generally positive reviews from critics. The Globe and Mail'' wrote that Smith played the role "with glorious oomph".

Personal life 
Smith married German photographer Erik Steingröver on April 4, 2009. They have one daughter, born in 2016.

Filmography

Film

Television

Notes

Accolades

References

External links

1980 births
Canadian film actresses
Canadian television actresses
Living people
Actresses from Vancouver
Female models from British Columbia
21st-century Canadian actresses